The R355 is a Regional Route in South Africa that connects the R46 near Ceres with Springbok via Calvinia.

The route's northern terminus is the N7 and N14 at Springbok, Northern Cape. It heads south-east. After 140 kilometres it reaches the R358. The routes are co-signed for a few kilometres heading south. They enter the Western Cape. The R355 then emerges and heads east-south-east, returning to the Northern Cape, to meet the R357. The two routes become co-signed heading east, and enter Loeriesfontein together. From Loeriesfontein, the R355 diverges heading south, before veering east to reach Calvinia. At Calvinia, the route meets the R27 and the two routes become co-signed heading west. West of the town, the R355 diverges and heads south. It passes through the Bloukrans Pass and the Tankwa Karoo National Park to enter the Western Cape for the second time. The route continues south and meets the south-west origin of the R356 shortly before ending itself at the R46 between Ceres and Touws River.

External links
 Routes Travel Info

References

Regional Routes in the Western Cape
Regional Routes in the Northern Cape